The EMD SW1504 is a  diesel locomotive built by General Motors' Electro-Motive Division. The type was sold only to Mexico's national railroad, Ferrocarriles Nacionales de México; 60 examples were built between May and August 1973. With the breakup of NdeM, the locomotives have passed away to the variety of successor railroad operators in Mexico, some have been sold to leasing companies in the USA.

See also 
List of GM-EMD locomotives

References 
 Laundry, Mark. The Yard Limit: EMD SW1504. Retrieved on March 23, 2005.
 
 Trainweb.org. The Unofficial EMD Homepage. Retrieved on March 23, 2005.
 McCall, S.A. EMD Switcher Dimensional Data. Retrieved on March 23, 2005.

External links 

EMD SW1504 photos at rrpicturearchives.net

B-B locomotives
SW1504
Diesel-electric locomotives of the United States
Standard gauge locomotives of the United States
Standard gauge locomotives of Mexico
Shunting locomotives